Sahibzada Ghulam Nizam-ud-Din Sialvi is a Pakistani politician who was a Member of the Provincial Assembly of the Punjab, from 2008 to May 2018.

Early life and education
He was born on 9 October 1980 in Sargodha.

He has a degree of Bachelor of Arts which he obtained in 2008 from Al-Khair University, Sindh.

Political career
He was elected to the Provincial Assembly of the Punjab as a candidate of Pakistan Muslim League (N) (PML-N) from Constituency PP-37 (Sarghoda-X) in 2008 Pakistani general election. He received 31,539 votes and defeated Muhammad Ali Raza Lahri, an independent candidate.

He was re-elected to the Provincial Assembly of the Punjab as a candidate of PML-N from Constituency PP-37 (Sarghoda-X) in 2013 Pakistani general election.

In December 2013, he was appointed as Parliamentary Secretary for livestock & dairy development.

References

Living people
Punjab MPAs 2013–2018
Punjab MPAs 2008–2013
1980 births
Pakistan Muslim League (N) MPAs (Punjab)
Shah Abdul Latif University alumni